Brian Johnson (born June 27, 1961) is an American politician serving in the Minnesota House of Representatives since 2013. A member of the Republican Party of Minnesota, Johnson represents District 32A in eastern Minnesota, which includes the cities of Cambridge, Isanti, and North Branch, and parts of Chisago and Isanti Counties.

Education and career
Johnson attended Hibbing Area Vocational Technical Institute, graduating with an A.A.S. in law enforcement. He worked as a firefighter and EMT in Braham and as a deputy sheriff for 17 years in Isanti County.

Minnesota House of Representatives
Johnson was elected to the Minnesota House of Representatives in 2012, following redistricting and the retirement of Roger Crawford, and has been reelected every two years since.

Johnson served as vice chair of the Public Safety & Security Policy and Finance Committee during the 2017 legislative session. After chair Tony Cornish resigned after multiple allegations of sexual harassment, Johnson became chair of the committee for the 2018 session. Johnson is the minority lead on the Housing Finance and Policy Committee and sits on the Judiciary Finance and Civil Law Committee.

Johnson opposes changes in state gun laws and has opposed bringing new legislation to the committee floor. He generally supports legislation restricting abortion. He voted yes on HF 812, which would have established abortion facility license requirements in the state. In 2021 he authored a bill modifying the law regarding the use of deadly force by police officers.

Electoral history

Personal life
Johnson is married to his wife, Diane. They have one child and reside in Castle Rock, Minnesota.

References

External links

Rep. Brian Johnson official Minnesota House of Representatives website
Rep. Brian Johnson official campaign website

1961 births
Living people
Republican Party members of the Minnesota House of Representatives
21st-century American politicians
People from Cambridge, Minnesota